The 2013 FIFA U-17 World Cup was the fifteenth tournament of the FIFA U-17 World Cup. The tournament was held in the United Arab Emirates between 17 October and 8 November. Nigeria won the tournament after defeating Mexico 3–0 in the final, claiming the country's fourth title. Sweden won the bronze with a 4–1 victory over Argentina in the third-place play-off match.

Bids
There were two official bids:

Venues
In June 2012, FIFA selected the Sheikh Khalifa International Stadium in Al Ain, the Al Nahyan Stadium in Abu Dhabi, the Al-Rashid Stadium in Dubai, the Emirates Club Stadium in Ras al-Khaimah and the Fujairah Club Stadium in the state of Fujairah as venues. The use of Sharjah Stadium in Sharjah was initially proposed, and finally selected as a venue, in September 2012. Mohammed Bin Zayed Stadium replaced Al Nahyan Stadium of Abu Dhabi and will host the final.

Teams
In addition to host nation United Arab Emirates, 23 nations qualified from six separate continental competitions.

1.Teams that made their debut.
2. This is the debut of 'Russia' as a nation since the cessation of the USSR in 1991.
3. This is the debut of 'Slovakia' as a nation since the cessation of Czechoslovakia in 1993.

Match officials

Squads

Teams had to name a 21-man squad (three of whom must be goalkeepers) by the FIFA deadline.

Draw
The final draw for group stage was held on 26 August 2013 in Abu Dhabi at the Bab Al Bahr Hotel at 19:00 (local time).

Prior to the draw, FIFA announced that as host, the United Arab Emirates would be placed as 'A1', to assist with ticket sales. The continental champions of the confederations AFC, CAF, CONCACAF, CONMEBOL, and UEFA are assigned to the other five groups. Teams from the same confederation cannot be drawn against each other at the group stage.

Logo and tickets
The logo of the competition was unveiled on 5 March 2013, including the local organising committee asking Omar Abdulrahman to be a 'brand ambassador' for this event.

'Stadium package' tickets for the Tournament went on sale on 26 June, with the ability to buy tickets per match once the draw has been made.

A falcon known as 'Shaqran' will be the mascot for the World Cup, after being introduced to local journalists on 13 May .

Group stage
The winners and runners-up from each group, as well as the best four third-placed teams, qualified for the first round of the knockout stage (round of 16).

The ranking of each team in each group is determined as follows:
 points obtained in all group matches;
 goal difference in all group matches;
 number of goals scored in all group matches;
If two or more teams are equal on the basis of the above three criteria, their rankings are determined as follows:
 points obtained in the group matches between the teams concerned;
 goal difference in the group matches between the teams concerned;
 number of goals scored in the group matches between the teams concerned;
 drawing of lots by the FIFA Organising Committee.

All times are local, UTC+04:00.

Group A

Group B

Group C

Group D

Group E

Group F

Ranking of third-placed teams
The four best teams among those ranked third are determined as follows:
 points obtained in all group matches;
 goal difference in all group matches;
 number of goals scored in all group matches;
 drawing of lots by the FIFA Organising Committee.

Knockout stage
In the knockout stages, if a match is level at the end of normal playing time, no extra time will be played, with the match to be determined by a penalty shoot-out.

Round of 16

Quarter-finals

Semi-finals

Play-off for third place

Final

Awards

Final ranking

Goalscorers
Top scorers after the end of the tournament this year.

7 goals
 Valmir Berisha

6 goals

 Boschilia
 Kelechi Iheanacho

5 goals

 Nathan
 Tomáš Vestenický

4 goals

 Joaquín Ibáñez
 Mosquito
 Iván Ochoa
 Taiwo Awoniyi
 Musa Yahaya
 Franco Acosta
 Leandro Otormín

3 goals

 Ryoma Watanabe
 Karim Achahbar
 Younes Bnou Marzouk
 Musa Muhammed
 Gustav Engvall

2 goals

 Sebastián Driussi
 Germán Ferreyra
 Matías Sánchez
 Nikola Zivotic
 Caio
 Jordan Hamilton
 Jorge Bodden
 Brayan Velásquez
 Luca Vido
 Moussa Bakayoko
 Franck Kessie
 Alejandro Díaz
 Ulises Jaimes
 Isaac Success
 Chidiebere Nwakali
 Samuel Okon
 Aleksandr Makarov
 Ramil Sheydayev
 Kevin Méndez

1 goal

 Lucio Compagnucci
 Rodrigo Moreira
 Leonardo Suárez
 Sascha Horvath
 Tobias Pellegrini
 Gabriel
 Joanderson
 Elias Roubos
 Alen Halilović
 Robert Murić
 Ante Roguljić
 Jeffri Flores
 Fredy Medina
 Ali Gholizadeh
 Mostafa Hashemi
 Amir Hossein Karimi
 Yousef Seyyedi
 Mohammed Salam
 Sherko Karim
 Vittorio Parigini
 Junior Ahissan
 Aboubakar Keita
 Yakou Meïté
 Daisuke Sakai
 Taro Sugimoto
 Kosei Uryu
 Nabil Jaadi
 Hamza Sakhi
 José Almanza
 Marco Granados
 Ulises Rivas
 Chidera Ezeh
 Chigozi Obasi
 Werner Wald
 Ervin Zorrilla
 Aleksandr Golovin
 Denis Vavro
 Michal Siplak
 Mirza Halvadžić
 Erdal Rakip
 Anton Salétros
 Carlos Strandberg
 Ali Suljić
 Firas Ben Larbi
 Mohamed Dräger
 Maher Gabsi
 Hazem Haj Hassen
 Chiheb Jbeli
 Alameri Zayed
 Khaled Khalfan
 Marcio Benítez
 Joel Bregonis
 Facundo Ospitaleche
 Franco Pizzichillo
 Shohjahon Abbasov
 Rustamjon Ashurmatov
 Jamshid Boltaboev
 José Caraballo
 José Márquez

1 own goal
 Duje Ćaleta-Car (playing against Uzbekistan)
 Érick Aguirre (playing against Nigeria)
 Linus Wahlqvist (playing against Japan)

References

External links
FIFA U-17 World Cup UAE 2013, FIFA.com
FIFA Technical Report

2013
2013 in youth association football
2013–14 in Emirati football
International association football competitions hosted by the United Arab Emirates
October 2013 sports events in Asia
November 2013 sports events in Asia